In Silence is the debut studio album by Norwegian band Fra Lippo Lippi. It was released in 1981 through record label Uniton. The album's gothic post-punk sound was heavily influenced by bands such as Joy Division and The Cure.

Track listing

Critical reception 

In their retrospective review, AllMusic panned the album, calling it "arguably the only unlistenable LP in Fra Lippo Lippi's career. [...] Fra Lippo Lippi were still trying to find themselves on In Silence; the band sounds lost, unable to find a hook that wasn't borrowed from The Cure or Joy Division." In their review of The Early Years, a compilation album comprising In Silence and the group's second album, Small Mercies, Tiny Mix Tapes called In Silence "the more interesting of the two" and the album "so strangely similar [to Joy Division] [it's] almost like having a new Joy Division/New Order album."

Re-issue 

In Silence, along with Small Mercies, was re-issued by Rune Arkiv in 2003 as the compilation album The Early Years.

Personnel 
 Fra Lippo Lippi

 Rune Kristoffersen
 Morten Sjøberg

 Technical

 Jesse A. Fernandez – sleeve photography

References

External links 

 

Fra Lippo Lippi (band) albums
1981 debut albums
Post-punk albums by Norwegian artists
Gothic rock albums by Norwegian artists